The United States Senate Committee on Banking, Housing, and Urban Affairs (formerly the Committee on Banking and Currency), also known as the Senate Banking Committee, has jurisdiction over matters related to banks and banking, price controls, deposit insurance, export promotion and controls, federal monetary policy, financial aid to commerce and industry, issuance of redemption of notes, currency and coinage, public and private housing, urban development, mass transit and government contracts.

The current chair of the committee is Democrat Sherrod Brown of Ohio, and the Ranking Member is Republican Tim Scott of South Carolina.

History
The committee is one of twenty standing committees in the United States Senate. The committee was formally established as the "Committee on Banking and Currency" in 1913, when Senator Robert L. Owen of Oklahoma sponsored the Federal Reserve Act. Senator Owen served as the committee's inaugural chairman.

Jurisdiction
In accordance of Rule XXV of the United States Senate, all proposed legislation, messages, petitions, memorials, and other matters relating to the following subjects are referred to the Senate Banking Committee:
 Banks, banking, and financial institutions;
 Control of prices of commodities, rents, and services;
 Deposit insurance;
 Economic stabilization and defense production;
 Export and foreign trade promotion;
 Export controls;
 Federal monetary policy, including Federal Reserve System;
 Financial aid to commerce and industry;
 Issuance and redemption of notes;
 Money and credit, including currency and coinage;
 Nursing home construction;
 Public and private housing (including veterans' housing);
 Renegotiation of Government contracts; and,
 Urban development and urban mass transit.

The Senate Banking Committee is also charged to "study and review, on a comprehensive basis, matters relating to international economic policy as it affects United States monetary affairs, credit, and financial institutions; economic growth, urban affairs, and credit, and report thereon from time to time."

Members, 118th Congress

Chairs

Committee on Banking and Currency, 1913–1970

Committee on Banking, Housing, and Urban Affairs, 1970–present

Historical membership rosters

117th Congress

Subcommittees

116th Congress

Subcommittees

115th Congress

Subcommittees
Source

114th Congress 

Subcommittees

113th Congress

See also
 List of current United States Senate committees
 United States House Committee on Financial Services, the congressional counterpart of this committee
 Pecora Commission,  the commission established to investigate the causes of the Wall Street Crash of 1929

References

External links
U.S. Senate Committee on Banking, Housing, and Urban Affairs (Archive)
Senate Banking, Housing, and Urban Affairs Committee. Legislation activity and reports, Congress.gov.

Banking
1913 establishments in Washington, D.C.
Organizations established in 1913